Arhodia is a monotypic moth genus in the family Geometridae. Its only species, Arhodia lasiocamparia, the pink arhodia, is found in mainland Australia and Tasmania. Both the genus and species were first described by Achille Guenée in 1857.

The wingspan is about 60 mm for males and 70 mm for females. The moth flies from October to January.

The larvae feed on Eucalyptus species.

References

Geometridae genera
Oenochrominae
Moths of Australia
Monotypic moth genera